The Bijou Theatre Building is located in Marinette, Wisconsin, USA. It was added to the National Register of Historic Places in 1993.

History
The building was constructed for Frank Lauerman to be both a vaudeville theater and a retail store. It was later transformed into a movie theater.

References

Commercial buildings on the National Register of Historic Places in Wisconsin
Cinemas and movie theaters in Wisconsin
Theatres on the National Register of Historic Places in Wisconsin
Former theatres in the United States
Buildings and structures in Marinette County, Wisconsin
Neoclassical architecture in Wisconsin
Theatres completed in 1905
National Register of Historic Places in Marinette County, Wisconsin
1905 establishments in Wisconsin